Picamilon (also known as N-nicotinoyl-GABA, pycamilon, and pikamilon) is a drug formed by a synthetic combination of niacin and γ-aminobutyric acid (GABA). It was developed in the Soviet Union in 1969 and further studied in both Russia and Japan as a prodrug of GABA.

In Russia, picamilon is sold as a prescription drug. The rights to the drug belong to the Russian pharmaceutical company NPK ECHO ("НПК ЭХО"). It is not approved for sale in the United States and has been deemed an adulterating agent in dietary supplements, with five American companies required to remove their picamilon products from the market in November, 2015.  However, as recently as 2020, picamilon has been found in pharmaceutical dosages in over-the-counter supplements in the US.

Mechanism of action and potential therapeutic applications
One study in animals showed that picamilon permeated the blood–brain barrier and then is hydrolyzed into GABA and niacin. The released GABA in theory would activate GABA receptors potentially producing an anxiolytic response. The second released component, niacin, is a vasodilator.

Detection in biological fluids 
Plasma picamilon concentrations are generally in the 500–3000 μg/L range during the first few hours after single oral doses of 50–200 mg with a half-life of 1–2 hours. The drug undergoes hydrolysis to GABA and nicotinic acid. Urinary excretion of parent drug and the two metabolites accounts for up to 79% of a single dose.

Regulation 
In the United States, the Food and Drug Administration ruled in 2015 that picamilon does not fit any of the dietary ingredient categories in the Dietary Supplement Health and Education Act of 1994, namely that it is not a vitamin; a dietary mineral; an herb or other botanical; an amino acid; a dietary substance for use by humans to supplement the diet by increasing the total dietary intake; or a concentrate, metabolite, constituent, extract, or combination of any ingredient described above that had been marketed in the United States before 1994. Despite the FDA ruling, picamilon remains an ingredient in supplements marketed as nootropics in the US.

References

External links 
 

Anxiolytics
Nicotinamides
GABA analogues
GABAA receptor agonists
GABAA-rho receptor agonists
GABAB receptor agonists
Russian drugs
Prodrugs
Drugs in the Soviet Union